The Battle of Frankfurt an der Oder on 13 April 1631 was a battle of the Thirty Years' War.
It was fought between the Swedish Empire and the Holy Roman Empire for the strategically important, fortified Oder crossing Frankfurt an der Oder, Brandenburg, Germany.

The town was the first major Imperial stronghold attacked by Sweden outside the Duchy of Pomerania, where Sweden had established a bridgehead in 1630. After a two-day siege, Swedish forces, supported by Scottish auxiliaries, stormed the town. The result was a Swedish victory. With the subsequent clearance of nearby Landsberg (Warthe) (now Gorzow), Frankfurt served to protect the Swedish army's rear when Gustavus Adolphus of Sweden proceeded further into Central Germany.

Prelude 

Swedish king Gustavus Adolphus started to intervene in the Thirty Years' War by supporting Stralsund against Wallenstein in 1628, and landed in Pomerania in June 1630. With the central parts of the Duchy of Pomerania, Sweden had gained a bridgehead in the Holy Roman Empire's northeasternmost corner, while the rest of the empire was occupied by forces of the Catholic League and Ferdinand II, Holy Roman Emperor. Except for Magdeburg, which had allied with Sweden on 1 August, the German Protestant states distrusted Gustavus Adolphus and hesitated to enter an alliance.

In January 1631, Swedish forces garrisoned in the Pomeranian bridgehead proceeded southwards, and sacked the Pomeranian towns of Gartz (Oder) and Greifenhagen (now Gryfino) near Pomerania's border with Brandenburg. Further southward advances along the Oder into the territory of George William, Elector of Brandenburg followed, and on 23 January 1631, Sweden allied with France in the Treaty of Bärwalde, concluded in Brandenburgian Bärwalde (now Mieszkowice).

Siege and storm of Frankfurt 

The Swedish forces, commanded by Gustavus Adolphus, were supported by Scottish auxiliaries commanded by John Hepburn and Robert Monro. They laid siege on the town for two days, and stormed it on the second day. The assault was successful and resulted in the sack of the town. The success was in part due to internal quarrels in the defending force—mercenaries who had not been paid refused to fight without receiving their pay first. The defenders were "slaughtered [...] where they stood" and suffered 3,000 deaths, compared to 800 casualties on the Swedish side. Many deaths occurred when the town was looted.

Aftermath 
Scottish major general in Swedish service John Leslie was appointed governor of the town and gave orders to have its defenses strengthened and the thousands of bodies buried. The latter task was achieved by digging mass graves for over a hundred bodies each; after six days, all dead had been buried. John Leslie was soon succeeded as Frankfurt's governor by another Scot, James MacDougal, who was in turn succeeded by a third Scot, Alexander Leslie.

Frankfurt served to protect the rear of the advancing Swedish army. The other major town in northeastern Brandenburg, Landsberg (Warthe) (now Gorzow) was taken on 23 April. Subsequently, George William, Elector of Brandenburg was forced into treaties with Sweden on 14 May, 20 June, and 10 September 1631, which put Sweden in charge of the Brandenburgian military capacities, but did not have the status of an actual alliance. Throughout 1631, Gustavus Adolphus of Sweden advanced into central Germany, and while Magdeburg was lost in May and Gustavus Adolphus was hard-pressed at Werben in July, the subsequent victory at Breitenfeld in September paved the way for his advance into southern Germany.

Notes

Sources

References

Bibliography 

1631 in Europe
Frankfurt an der Oder 1631
Frankfurt an der Oder 1631
Frankfurt an der Oder 1631
Frankfurt an der Oder 1631
Frankfurt an der Oder
Gustavus Adolphus of Sweden
Frankfurt an der Oder